Jake Haener (born March 16, 1999) is an American football quarterback for the Fresno State Bulldogs.

High school career
Haener attended Monte Vista in Danville, California. During his high school career he threw for 8,464 yards and a school-record 90 touchdowns. He committed to the University of Washington to play college football.

College career

Washington 
After redshirting his first year at Washington in 2017, Haener appeared in four games as a backup to Jake Browning in 2018, completing nine of 13 passes for 107 yards with one touchdown and one interception.

Fresno State 
In 2019, Haener transferred to California State University, Fresno. After sitting out his first year at Fresno State due to transfer rules, Haener became the starter in 2020. In six games, he completed 150 of 232 passes for 2,021 yards, 14 touchdowns and five interceptions. He remained the starter in 2021.

On November 30, 2021, Haener entered the NCAA transfer portal. On December 8, Haener withdrew from the transfer portal and returned to Fresno State.

Statistics

Personal life
His Mother Julie is a long-time anchor at KTVU-TV in Oakland and was an anchor in Fresno in the early 1990s.

References

External links
Fresno State Bulldogs bio

Living people
People from Danville, California
Players of American football from California
Sportspeople from the San Francisco Bay Area
American football quarterbacks
Washington Huskies football players
Fresno State Bulldogs football players
1999 births